The 10th Parliament of Queen Elizabeth I was summoned by Queen Elizabeth I of England on 11 September 1601 and assembled on 27 October 1601. It was to be her final Parliament.

At the State Opening of Parliament the Lord Keeper Thomas Egerton explained that the Parliament had been called to authorise the replenishment of the Queen's coffers due to the cost of the war in Ireland and the ongoing threat of Spanish invasion. He also indicated that the Queen wished to see the Parliament dissolved by Christmas. John Croke, Recorder of London and MP for London, was appointed Speaker of the House of Commons.

The question of the subsidy was debated and agreed by November 9 and Parliament turned to other matters. The main issue of the day was the question of the abuse of monopolies. The Crown had for many years granted profitable monopoly rights to individuals in return for favours rendered to the crown, thereby raising the prices of the goods and services involved. Parliament considered this as at least an abuse of Royal privilege and at worst an illegal practice. Previous promises by the Crown to redress the problem had not been fulfilled. Feelings on the issue were so strong that Elizabeth was forced to defuse the situation by inviting 141 MPs to her palace where she delivered the Golden Speech, in which she revealed that it would be her final Parliament (she was 68 years old) and won over the delegation with a speech addressing the love and respect she had for the country, her position, and the Members themselves. She did however commit herself to publishing by Proclamation her intention to abolish some patents and allow others to submit to trial by common law.

The remaining Parliamentary time was dedicated to social and economic matters. The Poor Laws of 1597-98 were codified into a new Act which remained on the Statute Book until 1834. A number of bills concerning alehouses and drunkenness, blasphemy, regulation of weights and measures, and the enforcement of church attendance failed to be passed into law. Nevertheless, a total of 19 public and 10 private measures did receive the royal assent.

Notable Acts of the Parliament
 Poor Relief Act 1601
 Charitable Uses Act 1601

See also
 Acts of the 10th Parliament of Elizabeth I
 List of parliaments of England

References

 

1601 establishments in England
1601 in politics